Samuel Woolley Taylor (February 5, 1907 – September 26, 1997) was an American novelist, scriptwriter, and historian.

Biography 
Taylor was born in Provo, Utah to Janet "Nettie" Maria Woolley and John W. Taylor, the son of John Taylor, president of the Church of Jesus Christ of Latter-day Saints (LDS Church) from 1880 to 1887.  Samuel's father was a former member of the church's Quorum of the Twelve Apostles, having left in 1905 in protest over the church's Second Manifesto abandonment of polygamy the previous year.  Despite his father's ecclesiastical history and excommunication in 1911, Samuel was raised in the LDS Church.  He later wrote a biography of his father called Family Kingdom, and one of his grandfather titled The Kingdom or Nothing.

In the late 1920s Taylor attended Brigham Young University (BYU) studying journalism.  He became editor of the student newspaper Y News, in which he also wrote a weekly column called "Taylored Topics."  After covering a story about rum-running on campus, Taylor was questioned by school administration to divulge his sources, but he refused.  After a temporary suspension, he returned to his previous position with the paper, and returned to upsetting administration with his writing.  After six suspensions, he later recalled that he could "take a hint" and dropped out of BYU.  By then he had already published five articles in nationally distributed magazines.  He decided to "escape" Utah and followed Gay Dimick, a fellow BYU student, back to her native California.  They married there in 1934 and established their longtime home in Redwood City.

He served as an officer in the United States Army Air Forces public relations office in the European theatre of World War II.

He was awarded an honorary lifetime membership by the Association for Mormon Letters at the 1994 AML Awards.

Writings

Film scripts and adaptations
In 1942, the first film based on one of Taylor's stories, The Man Who Returned to Life, was released.  This was later followed in 1951 by The Man with My Face based on his novel of the same name.

His first foray into screenwriting began with Bait in 1954.

In contrast to the serious nature of these films, Taylor was also the author of two short stories, published in Liberty weekly magazine, on which the Disney movies The Absent-Minded Professor (1961), Son of Flubber (1963), and Flubber (1997) were based.

He is sometimes incorrectly credited as the writer of Alfred Hitchcock's 1958 film Vertigo, though that screenplay was actually written by Samuel A. Taylor.

General novels
Those novels not dealing specifically with Mormonism:
 The Grinning Gismo, A. a. Wyn Inc, 1951.
 The Man with My Face, 1948
 Take My Advice, Mr. President, Taylor Trust, 1996, .
 Uranium Fever, with Raymond Taylor, Macmillan Company, 1970

Latter-day Saint works 
Biography and history
 Family Kingdom, New York: McGraw-Hill Book Co., 1951, .
 I Have Six Wives, New York: Greenberg, 1956. (based on the life of Rulon C. Allred)
 Vineyard by the Bay, San Mateo, 1968. (uncredited; history of the LDS Church in the San Francisco Bay Area)
 Nightfall at Nauvoo (Nauvoo House and Nauvoo Temple), New York: Macmillan, 1971 .
 The Kingdom or Nothing, New York: Macmillan, 1976, .  (republished as The Last Pioneer, Signature Books, 1999)
 Rocky Mountain Empire, New York: Macmillan, 1978, .
 The John Taylor Papers (2 vols.), Redwood City, Cal: Taylor Trust, 1984.
 Taylor-made Tales, Murray, Utah: Aspen Books, 1994, .  (autobiography)

Humorous fiction
 Heaven Knows Why!, New York: A.A. Wyn, 1948.  Mormon comedy set in Utah, originally published as serials in Collier's magazine under the title "The Mysterious Way". Has been called the funniest piece of fiction written on Mormon culture.

Criticism
Taylor was an early proponent of a Mormon literature in essays such as "Peculiar  People, Positive  Thinkers  and  the  Prospects  of  Mormon  Literature" (Dialogue, 1967) and "Little Did She Realize: Writing for the Mormon Market" (Dialogue, 1969), wherein he decried the current state of the literature and called for greater artistry and realism.  Taylor continued to publish criticism related to Mormon culture in Dialogue as well as Sunstone magazine.

Notes

Sources 
.
.
.
.
.

External links
Samuel W. Taylor: Talented Native Son — biography by Jean R. Paulson (August 1998)
Raymond and Samuel Taylor Correspondence in the Special Collections & Archives of Utah State University
The John Taylor Family Papers in the J. Willard Marriott Library Special Collections of the University of Utah

1907 births
1997 deaths
20th-century American novelists
20th-century American historians
American male non-fiction writers
American humorists
American Latter Day Saint writers
American male novelists
American male screenwriters
American short story writers
Apostolic United Brethren
Brigham Young University alumni
Historians of the Latter Day Saint movement
American magazine writers
Writers from Provo, Utah
People from Redwood City, California
Military personnel from Utah
United States Army Air Forces officers
20th-century American biographers
American male short story writers
Novelists from Utah
Latter Day Saints from Utah
Latter Day Saints from California
Screenwriters from California
Screenwriters from Utah
20th-century American male writers
Taylor family (Latter Day Saints)
20th-century American screenwriters
American male biographers